Lagoon Drive station is an under construction Honolulu Rail Transit station in Honolulu, Hawaii. It is part of the third HART segment, scheduled to open in 2031.

The Hawaiian Station Name Working Group proposed Hawaiian names for the twelve rail stations on the eastern end of the rail system (stations in the Airport and City Center segments) in April 2019. The proposed name for this station, Āhua, means "hillock" or "mound" and refers to an ancient reef that was dredged to create Keʻehi Lagoon.

References

External links
 

Honolulu Rail Transit stations
Railway stations scheduled to open in 2031